San Giorgio delle Pertiche is a comune (municipality) in the Province of Padua in the Italian region Veneto, located about  northwest of Venice and about  northeast of Padua.

The municipality of San Giorgio delle Pertiche contains the frazioni (subdivisions, mainly villages and hamlets) Arsego and Cavino.

San Giorgio delle Pertiche borders the following municipalities: Borgoricco, Campo San Martino, Campodarsego, Camposampiero, Curtarolo, Santa Giustina in Colle, Vigodarzere.

Demographic evolution

References

Cities and towns in Veneto